The 2004 Formula BMW Asia season was won by Marchy Lee of Hong Kong, driving for Team Meritus. Lee finished the season on 250 points, followed by BMW Junior driver, 24-year-old You Kyong-Ouk and Rookie Cup winner Mehdi Bennani), both on 124 points. Lee received an extra prize in recognition of his extraordinary achievements – a three-day test with the Team Rosberg Formula 3 outfit.

Teams and drivers
All cars were Mygale FB02 chassis powered by BMW engines.

Races

Standings 
Points were awarded as follows:

Drivers' Championship

Rookie Cup

References

External links
 BMW Group's press releases for Formula BMW Asia
 BMW-Motorsport.com

Formula BMW seasons
2004 in motorsport
2004 in Asian sport
BMW Asia